Stephen Rodney Humphries (born 29 May 1961) is an English former footballer, who played as a goalkeeper.

Career
A product of the Leicester City youth team, Humphries would sign professional for Leicester in 1978, however made no league appearances with the club.

After leaving Leicester in 1981, he would have a spell with Vancouver Whitecaps, before returning to Britain for spells in the English Football League with Doncaster Rovers, Cardiff City, Wrexham and Oldham Athletic.

He would return to Leicester City in 1982, however once again did not make a league appearances for them.

After that he would move to non-league Kettering Town before moving to Barnet in 1986.

In 1987 he would be capped by England Semi-Pro.

In 1994 Humphries would become a sports marketing manager in the city of Leicester, during which he was bid director for Leicester to secure the 8th National Special Olympics GB Summer Games in 2009 – which he was appointed Games Director of.

References

1961 births
Living people
English Football League players
Leicester City F.C. players
Vancouver Whitecaps (1974–1984) players
Doncaster Rovers F.C. players
Cardiff City F.C. players
Wrexham A.F.C. players
Oldham Athletic A.F.C. players
Kettering Town F.C. players
Barnet F.C. players
Association football goalkeepers
English footballers
English expatriate sportspeople in Canada
Expatriate soccer players in Canada
English expatriate footballers